7,N,N-trimethyltryptamine (7-methyl-DMT, 7-TMT), is a tryptamine derivative which acts as an agonist of 5-HT2 receptors. In animal tests, both 7-TMT and its 5-methoxy derivative 5-MeO-7-TMT produced behavioural responses similar to those of psychedelic drugs such as DMT, but the larger 7-ethyl and 7-bromo derivatives of DMT did not produce psychedelic responses despite having higher 5-HT2 receptor affinity in vitro (cf. DOBU, DOAM). 7-TMT also weakly inhibits reuptake of serotonin but with little effect on dopamine or noradrenaline reuptake.

See also 
 2,N,N-TMT
 5,N,N-TMT
 7-Methyl-αET
 7-Chloro-AMT

References 

Serotonin receptor agonists
Tryptamines
Dimethylamino compounds